Marilovo is a rural locality (a village) in Verkhnevarzhenskoye Rural Settlement, Velikoustyugsky District, Vologda Oblast, Russia. The population was 24 as of 2002.

Geography 
Marilovo is located 74 km southeast of Veliky Ustyug (the district's administrative centre) by road. Andronovo is the nearest rural locality.

References 

Rural localities in Velikoustyugsky District